The gravelly-soil ctenotus (Ctenotus lateralis)  is a species of skink found in Queensland in Australia.

References

lateralis
Reptiles described in 1978
Taxa named by Glen Milton Storr